Kołomąć  is a village in the administrative district of Gmina Gryfice, within Gryfice County, West Pomeranian Voivodeship, in north-western Poland.

In Kołomąć, there are ruins of the church, the chapel, and a German cemetery.

See also 

 History of Pomerania

References

Villages in Gryfice County